Jailhouse Rock may refer to:
"Jailhouse Rock" (song), a 1957 song first recorded by Elvis Presley
Jailhouse Rock (film), a 1957 film starring Elvis Presley
Jailhouse Rock (EP), an extended-play single released in conjunction with the above film
 Jailhouse Rock  (a 2004 musical play based on the above mentioned 1957 film) by UK writer and producer  Alan  Janes
Jailhouse Rock (Utah), a landform in Capitol Reef National Park, Utah
Jailhouse rock (fighting style)